Operation Breadbasket was an organization dedicated to improving the economic conditions of black communities across the United States of America.

Operation Breadbasket was founded as a department of the Southern Christian Leadership Conference (SCLC) in 1962, and was operated by Rev. Fred C. Bennette of Atlanta. The first activities were in Atlanta and other Southern cities.

A key figure in the later history of Operation Breadbasket was Jesse Jackson. In 1964, Jackson left his native South Carolina to study at the Chicago Theological Seminary. He participated in SCLC's movement in Selma.  When Jackson returned from Selma, he joined SCLC's effort to establish a beachhead in Chicago.

In 1966, SCLC selected Jackson to be head of the Chicago chapter of its Operation Breadbasket.  Influenced by the example of Rev. Leon H. Sullivan in Philadelphia, a key goal of the organization was to foster "selective buying" (boycotts) as a means to pressure white businesses to hire blacks and purchase goods and services from black contractors.  Sullivan's plan was not without its predecessors.  One was Dr. T.R.M. Howard, a wealthy doctor and community leader on the South Side and key financial contributor to Operation Breadbasket.  Before he moved from Mississippi to Chicago, Howard had developed a national reputation as a civil rights leader, surgeon, and entrepreneur.

As head of the Regional Council of Negro Leadership, Howard had successfully organized a boycott of service-stations that refused to provide restrooms for blacks. Jackson's application of these methods, however, had a seamier aspect including cronyism and strong-arming businesses to donate money to Operation Breadbasket.

Noah Robinson Jr., who had just graduated from the Wharton School of Finance and Commerce of the University of Pennsylvania, came to Chicago in 1969, to become full-time director of the Commercial Division of Operation Breadbasket.  Robinson was Jesse Jackson's half-brother and sometime rival. Robinson would later be sentenced to life imprisonment for murdering a rival known as Leroy Barber.

In December 1971, Jackson had a falling-out with Ralph Abernathy, King's successor as head of the SCLC. Jackson and his allies broke off from SCLC and formed the wholly independent Operation PUSH (People United to Save Humanity). The founding goals were similar to those of the Operation Breadbasket. Despite Jackson's departure, Operation Breadbasket continued for a brief time under Robinson's leadership.

Breadbasket Orchestra and Choir
The Breadbasket Orchestra and Choir, with Ben Branch as musical director, performed benefits for Martin Luther King Jr. and Operation/PUSH. Just moments before being assassinated, King had asked Branch to play a Negro spiritual, "Precious Lord, Take My Hand," at a rally that was to have been held two hours later.

Cannonball Adderley, in the introduction to the title track of his 1969 album Country Preacher, makes a specific mention of Branch in recognition of his work as leader of the Operation Breadbasket Orchestra and Choir.

Notes

Civil rights movement
History of African-American civil rights
Organizations established in 1962